She Never Died is a 2019 Canadian horror comedy film directed by Audrey Cummings and written by Jason Krawczyk. The movie is intended as a follow up sister-sequel to Krawczyk's 2015 movie He Never Died, which starred Henry Rollins, and is set within the same universe. Krawczyk had initially intended the 2015 film to be expanded into a miniseries and follow-up film, but repurposed the script into She Never Died after the endeavor was cancelled.

This iteration stars Olunike Adeliyi in a role similar to Rollins' character Jack, playing a mysterious recluse with a hunger for human flesh and a talent for violence. Noah Dalton Danby and Michelle Nolden play the film's main antagonists, while Peter MacNeill and Kiana Madeira star as a grizzled detective and innocent bystander.

The film premiered at Cinefest Sudbury on 19 September 2019.

Plot
The film opens to a city plagued by human-trafficking, where an inhumanly strong Lacey enters to foil a late-night abduction, devouring the attacker in a flood of screams and allowing the victim to flee.

A tired and aging Detective Godfrey leaves the police station to continue his one-man investigation of a comfortably sinister character (Terrance), whom he suspects to be in charge of a trafficking operation. He takes up a surveillance post in an abandoned warehouse district where a disheveled Lacey has also been waiting for the suspect to arrive. With apparent disregard of the detective’s presence, she forces entrance into the compound. Inside, a young man is being forced into a game of Russian roulette between himself and a chained dog for the entertainment of a live-streamed audience. Lacey interrupts to kill the man and savagely remove his eyes for a snack, apparently unaffected by a gunshot to the head. The man behind the camera flees to find his boss, Terrance, engaged in his own game of torture. Both returning to the scene, they find the body dismembered and the incident recorded; meanwhile Lacey leaves frustrated, ignoring Godfrey as he enters to discover what has happened.

Similar to He Never Died the antisocial Lacey finds refuge in a boring diner, seeking only oatmeal and tea. With Godfrey at home in disbelief, Terrance seeks to verify his own disbelief by showing the footage to his boss and sibling, Meredith. The pair, comically comfortable in their criminal enterprise, plot to capture Lacey in order to profit off of her abilities. The next day Godfrey returns to find Lacey and the two decide to talk at the diner, Lacey is forthcoming about her cannibalistic needs that she claims to satisfy only by eating evil people; in this case, Terrance. Godfrey realises Lacey is his only hope in exacting retribution so he offers her up targets in exchange for a place to stay. Lacey promptly finds and kills two of these targets in a suspicious apartment and, after conferring with Godfrey, she returns to release their detainee, Suzzie. Though initially afraid Suzzie follows Lacey to the diner in awe of her abilities. The bubbly Suzzie is intent on staying with Lacey and becoming her friend.

Godfrey heads off to investigate the apartment where Terrance finds and captures him, winding up strapped to a chair in the company of Meredith. After a casual conversation, she then leaves Terrance to interrogate Godfrey for Lacey’s whereabouts. Terrance and a crony then track down Lacey, who is indifferent to being beaten and captured, taking her back to their compound to be heavily restrained. Suzzie, who has witnessed Lacey’s abduction seeks Godfrey’s help at the police station where only the desk sergeant is concerned enough to help; all the while, the criminal siblings are beginning to experiment on Lacey for their amusement. A concerned and reckless Suzzie finds a way into the compound, passing through a party for the rich and powerful before finding and freeing Godfrey. Together they attempt to rescue an impaled Lacey who erupts into a rage of power to decapitate Terrance and wreak havoc on the party; a rampage that concludes with Meredith being thrown off the rooftop.

Much later, a retired Godfrey runs into Lacey at the laundromat. During a friendly farewell they exchange first names, revealing Lacey to really be Lilith. After Godfrey leaves, the haunting man in the hat finally appears clearly to Lacey, so she addresses her frustration about immortality to him, assuming him to be God. The film ends foreboding an apocalypse, as revealed to Godfrey at home by yet another bulletproof character.

The ending shot is of four motorcycle license plates that reference Revelations and the four horsemen of the apocalypse. This was alluded to at the beginning by the "pantless" man in the cell that speaks to Godfrey.

Cast
 Olunike Adeliyi as Lacey / Lilith
 Peter MacNeill as Godfrey
 Kiana Madeira as Suzzie
 Michelle Nolden as Meredith
 Noah Dalton Danby as Terrance
 Edsson Morales as Jerry
 Katie Messina as Janice
 Murray Furrow as Vaughn
 Lawrence Gowan as Man in the Hat
 Nick Stojanovic as Driver Dan

Reception

Critical response
The review aggregator website Rotten Tomatoes surveyed  and, categorizing the reviews as positive or negative, assessed 13 as positive and 0 as negative for a  rating. Ian Sedensky of Culture Crypt gave the film an 80/100, summarising it as "…an updated, unusual experience in abnormality whose mundane moments are punctuated by sparks of savage horror and slow strokes of deadpan humour."

Awards

References

2019 films
2019 horror films
Films about cannibalism
2010s English-language films